Jurerê International is an affluent seaside resort in the eponymous neighborhood of Jurerê in Florianópolis, the capital and second-largest city in the state of Santa Catarina in Brazil.

Gallery

Reference 

Neighbourhoods in Florianópolis